The 2016 NASCAR K&N Pro Series West was the sixty-third season of the K&N Pro Series West. It began at Irwindale Speedway on March 19 and concluded at All American Speedway on October 15. Chris Eggleston entered the season as the defending drivers' Champion. Todd Gilliland won the championship, thirteen points in front of Ryan Partridge.

Gilliland also became the youngest champion in West Series and NASCAR history, winning the title at 16 years and 5 months. The record for youngest champion in all of NASCAR was broken by Sam Mayer's 2019 East Series championship when he was 16 years, 3 months, and 8 days. However, Gilliland remains to this day the youngest West Series champion.

Drivers

Notes

Schedule
All of the races in the 2016 season were televised on NBCSN and were on a tape delay basis.

Notes

Results and standings

Races

Notes
1 – Qualifying was set by the fastest lap times from Saturday's race.
2 – The qualifying session for the Toyota/NAPA Auto Parts 150 presented by TriCo Welding Supplies was cancelled due to weather. The starting line-up was decided by Owners' championship.

Drivers' championship

(key) Bold – Pole position awarded by time. Italics – Pole position set by final practice results or 2015 Owner's points. * – Most laps led.

Notes
1 – Jim Inglebright received championship points, despite the fact that he did not start the race.
2 – Scored points towards the K&N Pro Series East.
3 – James Cooley received championship points, despite the fact that he withdrew prior to the race.

See also

2016 NASCAR Sprint Cup Series
2016 NASCAR Xfinity Series
2016 NASCAR Camping World Truck Series
2016 NASCAR K&N Pro Series East
2016 NASCAR Whelen Modified Tour
2016 NASCAR Whelen Southern Modified Tour
2016 NASCAR Pinty's Series
2016 NASCAR Whelen Euro Series

References

ARCA Menards Series West